This is a list of Harlequin Romance novels released in 1977.

Releases

References 

Romance novels
Lists of novels
1977 novels